Noble Lake (also Nobles, Nobles Lake) is an unincorporated community in Jefferson County, Arkansas, United States.

Education
Noble Lake is in the Pine Bluff School District. It operates Pine Bluff High School.

Noble Lake was formerly in the Linwood School District. On July 1, 1984, the Linwood School District consolidated into the Pine Bluff school district.

 for pre-kindergarten all PBSD areas are now assigned to Forrest Park/Greenville School.

Notes

Unincorporated communities in Jefferson County, Arkansas
Unincorporated communities in Arkansas